Song Yu (298–263 BC) was a Chinese poet from the late Warring States period, and is known as the traditional author of a number of poems in the Verses of Chu (Chu ci 楚辭).  Among the Verses of Chu poems usually attributed to Song Yu are those in the Jiu Bian section. Also credited to Song Yu, somewhat improbably, are several fu collected in the 6th century literary anthology Wen Xuan.

Biography 
Biographic information about Song Yu tends to be anecdotal, rather than truly historical, and little reliable information about Song's life exists.  Historical accounts agree that Song was from the state of Chu, and was born in the city of Yan  (modern Yicheng, Hubei Province), and lived during the reign of King Xiang of Chu (r. 298–263 BC).

Works 
According to the section covering literature and art in the Book of Han, Song wrote 16 works, but only 14 of them have been handed down, such as Jiu Bian and Dengtuzi Haose Fu. However, it is uncertain if, with the exception of Jiu Bian, these works were actually written by Song.  Wang Yi the noted Chu Ci anthologist and commentator also attributes the "Zhao Hun" (Summons of the Soul) to Song Yu. As a writer of cifu, Song was an accomplished successor to Qu Yuan with his own original style. In the fu poems attributed to Song Yu in the Wen Xuan literary anthology compiled by Xiao Tong (501–531), the poems appear in the context of a purported dialogue between Song Yu and King Xiang of Chu, in which the King requests a fu on a certain subject.  However, this is likely to be a literary device deployed by a later author, rather than an authentic historical record of a real event. Song's name has long been put together with Qu Yuan's as "Qu-Song". Qu Yuan is known for writing poems with a strong personal voice.

Song Yu's main contribution to Classical Chinese poetry can be considered to be the development of the theme of nature together with an implicit sense of inherent pathos. Apart from proving a rich source of reference points for Chinese poets in centuries to come, many Chinese idioms that are still widely used today can be traced back to his poems.

See also
Chu ci
Fu (poetry)
List of Chuci contents
Liu An
Liu Xiang (scholar)
Nine Changes
Qu Yuan
Wang Yi (librarian)

Notes

References
Hawkes, David, translator and introduction (2011 [1985]). Qu Yuan et al., The Songs of the South: An Ancient Chinese Anthology of Poems by Qu Yuan and Other Poets. London: Penguin Books. 
 
 Jiang, Liangfu, "Song Yu". Encyclopedia of China (Chinese Literature Edition), 1st ed.

External links 
 
 

3rd-century BC Chinese poets
Chu state people
Zhou dynasty poets